Hanan Samet is a Computer Science researcher and Distinguished University Professor at the University of Maryland's Computer Science Department, which is part of the University of Maryland College of Computer, Mathematical, and Natural Sciences.  He completed his PhD at Stanford University in 1975.

Samet is a pioneer in research on quadtrees and other multidimensional spatial data structures for sorting spatial information, as well as having written several well-received books.  He has profoundly influenced the theory and application of these areas of research and his impact can be seen in many real-world applications including Google Earth, the world’s most widely used graphics application.

Awards
 2020 Distinguished Career in Computer Science, Washington Academy of Sciences
 2013 University of Maryland Distinguished University Professor
 2012 Paris Kanellakis Theory and Practice Award
1996 Fellow Association for Computing Machinery
1996 Fellow International Association for Pattern Recognition
1991 Fellow Institute of Electrical and Electronics Engineers

External links

References

Researchers in geometric algorithms
Fellows of the Association for Computing Machinery
Living people
Stanford University alumni
University of Maryland, College Park faculty
Fellows of the Institution of Electrical Engineers
Fellows of the International Association for Pattern Recognition
Year of birth missing (living people)